A Marine Surveyor (also referred to as a  "yacht & small craft surveyor", "hull & machinery surveyor" and/or "cargo surveyor") is a person who inspects, surveys or examines marine vessels in order to assess damage, inspect or monitor their condition and that of any cargo on board. Marine surveyors also inspect equipment intended for new or existing vessels to ensure compliance with various standards or specifications. Marine surveys typically include the structure, machinery and equipment (navigational, safety, radio, etc.) and general condition of a vessel and/or cargo. They also involve judging materials on board and their condition. Because certifications and subsequent payments are processed only after the surveyor has expressed his or her satisfaction, a marine surveyor holds a prestigious position in the shipbuilding industry. Marine Surveyors are highly qualified and technically sound, and are usually selected after thorough evaluation procedures. Their duties apply to a wide range of seafaring vessels.

Marine surveying is closely associated with marine insurance, damage and salvage, accident and fraud investigation, as insurers generally lack the training and skills required to perform a detailed assessment of the condition of a vessel. Marine surveyors are hired on a fee basis by customers seeking insurance directly and maintain professional autonomy in order to provide an unbiased view. Independent marine surveyors are often employed by the clients of marine insurers to provide evidence in support of damage claims made against the insurer. Insurance companies cannot require customers to use specific marine surveyors and risk legal scrutiny and potential recourse if they impose surveyor requirements.

Marine surveyors use many credentials, letters, and terms such as "accredited," "certified," "qualified," "USSA," "ACMS," "AMS," "CMS," etc. There are many ways to train to become a marine surveyor including taking correspondence courses, apprenticing, and/or utilizing prior marine experience. Marine surveyors pursue their profession independently of required organizations, and there is currently no national or international licensing requirement for marine surveyors.  The U.S. Coast Guard does not approve or certify marine surveyors; however it adopted Navtech USSA Marine Surveyor practices in the eighties for its inspection standards.  All association terms and initials represent training and certification by private organizations, and the end users of boating seeking to comply with their insurance company's underwriting process dictates surveyor demand.

Qualities and qualifications

Marine Surveying remains a largely unregulated industry and anyone may practice as a surveyor. Qualifications for a Marine Surveyor generally involve the following: Working knowledge of ship's electrical & mechanical systems, fundamental understanding of boat design & construction. Generally considered important as well as engineering certifications are errors and omissions, and liability insurance to protect from injury or other hazards created by potential mistakes. A marine surveyor is generally not hired without errors and omissions insurance, also known as professional indemnity insurance. If a marine surveyor is not insured, there is potential for mistakes which the client is liable for, and this scenario is generally avoided by large clients.

A marine surveyor who is a member of a professional body such as the Society of Accredited Marine Surveyors (USA) or the International Institute of Marine Surveying is more likely to be hired by a client.

When it comes to defining the qualities and qualifications of a Marine Surveyor, a memorandum of 1834 has not been bettered:

General duties of a Classification Society marine surveyor
A marine surveyor may perform the following tasks:
Conduct surveys throughout the ship's life (building new ship, annual survey, interim survey, special survey) to ensure standards are maintained;
Perform inspections required by domestic statutes and international conventions by the International Maritime Organization (IMO);
Witness tests and operation of emergency and safety machinery and equipment;
Measure ships for tonnage and survey them for load line assignment;
Attend court as an expert witness and assist in coroner's inquiries;
Investigate marine accidents.
Determine "Fair Market Value, "Damage Repair Costs", and Replacement Value".

Types of marine surveyor

Government surveyor
A government surveyor performs ship registration surveys, surveys of foreign-going ships and local draft, and generally enforces ship safety standards to ensure marine industrial safety. Government-appointed marine surveyors, also called marine inspectors in some countries, belong to two groups that are not mutually exclusive: Flag State surveyors report to the government with whom the vessel is registered, and Port State surveyors report to the government into whose territory the vessel has entered. The Port State surveyors usually have the authority to detain vessels considered to have defects that may result in adverse impacts on life or the environment. Based on their government's legal framework, Flag State surveyors can impose conditions on the vessel such that failure to comply will result in the registration of the vessel being suspended or withdrawn. In this event, the vessel will find it almost impossible to trade.

Cargo surveyor
A Cargo surveyor is normally appointed by the Cargo Owner, usually for Bulk/Grain Cargo. 
Their job is to perform a draft survey to determine the actual cargo loaded on board. They also confirm that the cargo loading is performed according to the law and is within the loadable limits. The vessel safety is also ascertain which includes momentum due to cargo shift which may render the vessel unsafe during the passage. Often high value commodities are witnessed during load out especially if they are contamination sensitive.

Classification surveyor
A classification surveyor inspects ships to make sure that the ship, its components and machinery are built and maintained according to the standards required for their class. Classification surveyors most generally have two roles: one is a representative of the classification society; and the other as an inspector on behalf of the country with which the vessel is registered (the flag state). The classification role is to ensure that during construction the vessel initially complies with the classification society's rules for construction and outfitting, and thereafter is maintained fit to proceed trading. The Flag State role is based on a clear set of guidelines issued by the registering country. On satisfactory completion of any survey, the classification surveyor makes recommendations to the classification society and/or the flag state. These may be that the vessel has a clean bill of health, or that various defects must be corrected within a given time.

Increasingly, both government and classification surveyors are becoming involved in confirming compliance with international treaties associated with such things as pollution, international security, and safety management schemes. They may also examine cargo gear to ensure that it meets various requirements or regulations. Government and classification surveyors are usually marine professionals mariners, such as a qualified ship's master, engineer, naval architect or radio officer.

Independent surveyor
A Independent marine surveyor may be asked to carry out a wide range of tasks, including examining ships' cargoes or on board conditions such as fuel quality; investigating accidents at sea (e.g., oil spillages or failure of machinery or structures which are not considered to be critical); and preparing accident reports for insurance purposes, and conducting drought surveys to analyze how much cargo has been lost or gained.

Independent surveyors also carry out condition surveys or per-purchased surveys (also known as "Condition and valuation" survey (C&V)) to determine the condition of the ship prior to charter or an acquisition. Many companies as P&I clubs, ship-owners, brokers, etc. employ or contract the services of a private marine surveyor in order to determine the condition of the ship.

Yacht and small craft surveyor
Yacht and small craft (Y&SC) surveyors specialize in inspecting smaller vessels, typically less than 24 meters, that are most often used for pleasure boating (both power and sail). Y&SC surveyors may be employed directly by larger marine insurance companies, but most often they are independent practitioners engaged directly by the boating public. Since using boats for pleasure (or "yachting") is a relatively recent phenomena, having only been widely practiced for the last century or so, Y&SC surveying has many unique aspects that are not shared with the more traditional forms of marine surveying described above. In the UK the Yacht Designers and Surveyors' Association has a broad professional membership dealing with the range of craft below and above 24 meters (excluding ships and cargo/container ships). The International Institute of Marine Surveying has over 1,000 members in more than 100 countries and provides regular face to face and online training seminars for both members and non-members at various UK and overseas locations.

MCA coding surveyor
All UK vessels in commercial use up to 24 meters load line length, which go to sea are required by law to comply with one of the Maritime and Coastguard Agency (MCA) Small Craft Codes. Vessels that meet the stringent requirements of MGN 280 code, or one of the other specialist small craft codes, or the Work boat 2 code, are issued with license certificates by one of several UK Certifying Authorities that are approved under contract by the MCA. Code surveyors have been interviewed, assessed and authorized as being competent by the Certifying Authorities, which include organizations such as the International Institute of Marine Surveying.

Marine surveyor training
There are very few institutions providing education and training in this specialist but vitally important field. One such organization is the International Institute of Marine Surveying (IIMS), a professional body that has been providing surveyor education courses for nearly 20 years. The IIMS provides Diploma Professional Qualification courses in both yacht and small craft as well as commercial ship surveying. The IIMS membership consists of marine surveyors, cargo surveyors, yacht and small craft surveyors and other professionals in the field. IIMS also offers a standalone Professional Qualification in Marine Corrosion. Suny Maritime College provides online survey classes in Cargo, Hull and Yacht and small craft.
In Australia The Australasian Institute of Marine surveyors has the first accredited course under the Mar 13 training package which meets the requirements for AMSA Accreditation. The offer Certificate 4 to Diploma level qualifications. Lloyd's Maritime Academy offers a Diploma and MSc in Marine Surveying by distance learning since 1998 with the UK National Maritime Training Center at the North Kent College in Gravesend and Middlesex University.  Maritime Training Academy offers a large number of industry recognized vocational distance learning diplomas to students within the marine industry including ship surveying.

See also
 National Association of Marine Surveyors
 International Marine & Yacht Surveyors Europe
 
 Vessel safety survey
 International Institute of Marine Surveying

References

Marine occupations